Garo Mardirossian (born 1956) is a prominent Armenian-American lawyer practicing in Los Angeles. Mardirossian has had significant law cases involving personal injury, civil rights, complex litigation, product liability, and constitutional law. Several of the cases he has been involved in have brought national and international attention, including the Dole bridal shower and Thomas beating cases by different police agencies. The Dole Family case involved many victims, including the television celebrity female wrestler known as Mt. Fiji (Emily Dole), and resulted in the highest monetary jury award against a policing agency in U.S. history.

See also

 Rodney King beating, another later Los Angeles major police brutality case.
 History of the Armenian Americans in Los Angeles
 Armenian diaspora

Notes

References

Further reading
Re Dole case
 California Lawyer, 1996 February, cover: “The Most Important Case You Never Heard Of – A Jury Speaks Out”.
 Berg, Martin; and Botts, Doug, “What the Jury Saw – An Oral History of a Landmark Case Rescued from Obscurity by the Integrity of its Jurors. Interviews by Martin Berg. Video stills by Doug Botts.” California Lawyer, 1996 February.

1956 births
Living people
People from Aleppo
People from Los Angeles
California lawyers
Lawyers from Los Angeles
Armenian lawyers
Whittier Law School alumni
University of California, Los Angeles alumni
Armenian-American history
American people of Armenian descent
Syrian people of Armenian descent